Matthew Barnson (born 1979) is an American composer.

Biography 
Barnson is a native of Utah and obtained his undergraduate degree from the Eastman School of Music. He pursued graduate studies at the University of Pennsylvania and Yale University. Barnson is the youngest recipient of a Barlow Commission from the BYU College of Fine Arts and Communications. He was awarded a 2009 Charles Ives Prize. He is currently an assistant professor of composition at Stony Brook University.

Works 
Barnson's works have been performed by the following individuals / groups:

- Arditti String Quartet
- Curtis Symphony Orchestra
- The New York Virtuoso Singers
- Members of Alarm Will Sound
- Members of the Philadelphia Orchestra
- Soprano Nicole Cabell
- Countertenor Ian Howell
- Academy Manson Ensemble, with conductor Simon Bainbridge
- Shouse Ensemble F-Plus

Discography
Sibyl Tones (Tzadik Records, 2014)

References

External links
 Matthew Barnson, official website
 StonyBrook University Department of Music Faculty Profile
 Guggenheim Foundation Fellow Profile
 Soundcloud Page

1979 births
American male composers
21st-century American composers
Living people
University of Pennsylvania alumni
Yale School of Music alumni
Eastman School of Music alumni
21st-century American male musicians